Non-Homologous Isofunctional Enzymes (NISE) are two evolutionarily unrelated enzymes that catalyze the same chemical reaction. Enzymes that catalyze the same reaction are sometimes referred to as analogous as opposed to homologous (Homology (biology), however it is more appropriate to name them as Non-homologous Isofunctional Enzymes, hence the acronym (NISE). These enzymes all serve the same end function but do so in different organisms without detectable similarity in primary and possibly tertiary structures.

Background 
Enzymes are classified based on recommendations from the Nomenclature Committee of the International Union of Biochemistry and Molecular Biology and are given an enzyme commission number, commonly referred to as an EC number. Each distinct enzymatic activity is given a recommended name and EC number. To be classified as a distinct enzyme, "direct experimental evidence is required that the proposed enzyme actually catalyses the reaction claimed"

History 
Examples of unrelated enzymes with similar functions were noted as early as 1943 by Warburg and Christian (1943) who discovered two different forms of fructose 1,6-bisphosphate aldolase, one occurring in yeast cells and the other occurring in rabbit muscle. In 1998 an article by Mariana Omelchenko et al, titled Analogous Enzymes: Independent Inventions in Enzyme Evolution  identified 105 EC numbers containing two or more proteins without detectable sequence similarity to each other. Of these 105 EC numbers, 34 EC nodes with distinct structural folds were located helping to show independent evolutionary origins. In 2010 another article by Mariana Omelchenko et al, titled Non-homologous isofunctional enzymes: A systematic analysis of alternative solutions in enzyme evolution listed the discovery of 185 distinct EC nodes with only 74 from the original 1998 list, summarizing their twelve year search and concluding that NISE exist for up to 10% of biochemical reactions.

Origins 
A possible mechanism for the formation and evolution of these enzymes is recruitment of existing enzymes that gain new functions by a modification in substrate specificity (specifically at or near the active site) or modification of the existing catalytic mechanism.

Importance 
Discovery of NISE can reveal new mechanisms for enzyme catalysis and specific information about biochemical pathways that can be particularly important for drug development.

Examples 
A popular example of NISE is the superoxide dismutase family of enzymes which contains three distinct forms (EC 1.15.1.1) 
  superoxide dismutase
  superoxide dismutase
 Nickel superoxide dismutase
CuZn (SOD1) superoxide dismutase was the first to be discovered and is a homodimer containing copper and zinc, found often in intracellular cytoplasmic spaces.  is a tetramer produced by a leader peptide targeting the manganese containing enzyme only in mitochondrial spaces. Nickel superoxide (SOD3) is the most recently characterized and exists only in extracellular spaces.

Another popular example of NISE are the cellulase family of enzymes, particularly Cellulose 1,4-beta-cellobiosidase also consisting of three distinct forms possessing endonuclease activity. (EC3.2.1.91).
 GH-48
 GH-7
 GH-6
Two classes exist, one class attacks the reducing end of cellulose and the other attacks the non reducing end. GH-6 family enzymes attacks the non reducing end of cellulose while GH-7 family enzymes attack the reducing end. GH-48 family enzymes are bacterial family enzymes only and attack the reducing end of cellulose.

Mechanisms for discovery 
Typical genome sequencing methods such as BLAST and the Hidden Markov model are used to find discrepancies and similarities in genomes.

References 

Enzymes